Nick Sanza (born February 6, 1955) is a Canadian retired professional ice hockey goaltender.

Playing career
Sanza played major junior in the Quebec Major Junior Hockey League (QMJHL) for three seasons with the Montreal Red White and Blue and Sherbrooke Beavers.  He set a league record for most shutouts in a single season with seven in 1974–75 (later tied by Roberto Luongo and Adam Russo).  He joined the North American Hockey League in 1975–76 and played with the Erie Blades and Beauce Jaros.

Sanza turned pro in 1975–76 with the Tucson Mavericks of the Central Hockey League (CHL).  Having been drafted 64th overall by the Denver Spurs in the 1975 WHA Amateur Draft, he joined the club in 1975-76.  He had also been drafted 150th overall in the 1975 NHL Entry Draft by the Atlanta Flames, but he never played a game in the NHL.

In 1976-77, Sanza returned to the minor leagues with the Greensboro Generals of the SHL.  Two seasons later, he enrolled at the University of Alberta and played in the Canadian university circuit.  In 1987-88, he went overseas to play in the Italian Serie A with HC Asiago and later with the Milan Devils.

References

External links

1955 births
Living people
Alberta Golden Bears ice hockey players
Atlanta Flames draft picks
Beauce Jaros players
Canadian ice hockey goaltenders
Denver Spurs (WHA) players
Denver Spurs draft picks
Erie Blades players
Greensboro Generals (SHL) players
Montreal Bleu Blanc Rouge players
Sherbrooke Castors players
Tucson Mavericks players